Edward B. Burden (March 22, 1925 – June 20, 1997) was a former member of the Ohio House of Representatives.

References 

1925 births
Members of the Ohio House of Representatives
1997 deaths
20th-century American politicians